Alfred Frederik "Fred" Eefting (born 14 February 1959) is a retired Dutch swimmer. He competed at the 1980 Summer Olympics in four events and finished sixth in the 100 m backstroke, fifth in the 200 m backstroke and seventh in the 4 × 100 m medley relay. Between 1977 and 1982 he won a national title in the 100 m backstroke (1979) and set several dozen national records in various backstroke, freestyle and medley disciplines.

References

1959 births
Living people
Dutch male freestyle swimmers
Dutch male backstroke swimmers
Swimmers at the 1980 Summer Olympics
Olympic swimmers of the Netherlands
Sportspeople from Utrecht (city)
20th-century Dutch people